Cany-Barville is a commune in the Seine-Maritime department in the Normandy region in northern France.

Geography

Heraldry

Population

Places of interest
 The church of St. Siméon, at Barville, dating from the 16th century
 The church of St. Martin, at Cany, dating from the 13th century
 The 17th-century chapel of St. Gilles and St. Leu
 The 17th-century château de Cany, built between 1640 and 1656 by François Mansart, with its chapel and a park
 Remains of a fortified manor house dating from the 14th century
 A feudal motte at Barville
 The 15th-century watermill and museum.

Notable people
 Louis Bouilhet, French poet, was born here.

See also
Communes of the Seine-Maritime department

References

External links

Official website of Cany-Barville 
The Chateau website 

Communes of Seine-Maritime